There are at least 120 named waterfalls in Montana.
A waterfall is a place where flowing water rapidly drops in elevation as it flows over a steep region or a cliff. Waterfalls are most commonly formed when a river is young.
 Akaiyan Falls, Flathead County, Montana, el. 
 Alpine Falls, Gallatin County, Montana, el. 
 Apex Falls, Gallatin County, Montana, el. 
 Apikuni Falls, Glacier County, Montana, el. 
 Appistoki Falls, Glacier County, Montana, el. 
 Arch Falls, Gallatin County, Montana, el. 
 Atlantic Falls, Glacier County, Montana, el. 
 Atsina Falls, Glacier County, Montana, el. 
 Baring Falls, Glacier County, Montana, el. 
 Barrier Falls, Missoula County, Montana, el. 
 Beaver Chief Falls, Flathead County, Montana, el. 
 Beaver Medicine Falls, Flathead County, Montana, el. 
 Big Falls, Cascade County, Montana, el. 
 Big Salmon Falls, Missoula County, Montana, el. 
 Bird Woman Falls, Flathead County, Montana, el. 
 Black Eagle Falls, Cascade County, Montana, el. 
 Boulder Falls, Ravalli County, Montana, el. 
 Buffalo Falls, Cascade County, Montana, el. 
 Calamity Falls, Carbon County, Montana, el. 
 Canyon Falls (Montana), Ravalli County, Montana, el. 
 Cascade Falls, Sanders County, Montana, el. 
 Cascade Falls, Park County, Montana, el. 
 Castner Falls, Cascade County, Montana, el. 
 Cataract Falls, Lewis and Clark County, Montana, el. 
 Cedar Falls, Madison County, Montana, el. 
 Champagne Falls, Gallatin County, Montana, el. 
 Charlie Falls, Carbon County, Montana, el. 
 Colter Falls (historical), Cascade County, Montana, el. 
 Crooked Falls, Cascade County, Montana, el. 
 Crow Creek Falls, Jefferson County, Montana, el. 
 Dawn Mist Falls, Glacier County, Montana, el. 
 Dawson Falls, Glacier County, Montana, el. 
 Deadwood Falls, Glacier County, Montana, el. 
 Dean Falls, Flathead County, Montana, el. 
 Double Falls, Lewis and Clark County, Montana, el. 
 Elizabeth Falls, Lake County, Montana, el. 
 Feather Plume Falls, Glacier County, Montana, el. 
 Feather Woman Falls, Flathead County, Montana, el. 
 Florence Falls, Glacier County, Montana, el. 
 Graves Creek Falls, Sanders County, Montana, el. 
 Grinnell Falls, Glacier County, Montana, el. 
 Gros Ventre Falls, Glacier County, Montana, el. 
 Grotto Falls, Gallatin County, Montana, el. 
 Hidden Falls, Glacier County, Montana, el. 
 Hole-in-the Wall Falls, Flathead County, Montana, el. 
 Hoodoo Cascade, Gallatin County, Montana, el. 
 Horsetail Falls, Park County, Montana, el. 
 Impasse Falls, Carbon County, Montana, el. 
 Ipasha Falls, Glacier County, Montana, el. 
 Knowles Falls, Park County, Montana, el. 
 Kootenai Falls, Lincoln County, Montana, el. 
 Lange Falls, Lewis and Clark County, Montana, el. 
 Little North Fork Falls, Lincoln County, Montana, el. 
 Lost Creek Falls, Mineral County, Montana, el. 
 Lower Falls, Lincoln County, Montana, el. 
 Martin Falls, Flathead County, Montana, el. 
 McDonald Falls, Flathead County, Montana, el. 
 Memorial Falls (Montana), Cascade County, Montana, el. 
 Miche Wabun Falls, Glacier County, Montana, el. 
 Mill Falls, Teton County, Montana, el. 
 Mission Falls, Lake County, Montana, el. 
 Mokowanis Cascade, Glacier County, Montana, el. 
 Monture Falls, Powell County, Montana, el. 
 Monument Falls, Flathead County, Montana, el. 
 Morning Eagle Falls, Glacier County, Montana, el. 
 Morrell Falls, Powell County, Montana, el. 
 Mud Creek Falls, Lake County, Montana, el. 
 Needle Falls, Flathead County, Montana, el. 
 North Fork Falls, Lewis and Clark County, Montana, el. 
 Oberlin Falls, Flathead County, Montana, el. 
 Ousel Falls, Gallatin County, Montana, el. 
 Overwhich Falls, Ravalli County, Montana, el. 
 Paiota Falls, Glacier County, Montana, el. 
 Palisade Falls, Gallatin County, Montana, el. 
 Palisades Falls, Gallatin County, Montana, el. 
 Paradise Falls, Lewis and Clark County, Montana, el. 
 Passage Falls, Park County, Montana, el. 
 Piegan Falls, Glacier County, Montana, el. 
 Pinkham Falls, Lincoln County, Montana, el. 
 Pintler Falls, Beaverhead County, Montana, el. 
 Pioneer Falls, Madison County, Montana, el. 
 Ptarmigan Falls, Glacier County, Montana, el. 
 Rainbow Falls, Glacier County, Montana, el. 
 Rainbow Falls, Cascade County, Montana, el. 
 Raven Quiver Falls, Glacier County, Montana, el. 
 Redrock Falls, Glacier County, Montana, el. 
 Rock Creek Falls, Powell County, Montana, el. 
 Rockwell Falls, Glacier County, Montana, el. 
 Running Eagle Falls, Glacier County, Montana, el. 
 Sacred Dancing Cascade, Flathead County, Montana, el. 
 Saint Mary Falls, Glacier County, Montana, el. 
 Salamander Falls, Glacier County, Montana, el. 
 Sentinel Falls, Carbon County, Montana, el. 
 Shower Falls, Gallatin County, Montana, el. 
 Siksika Falls, Glacier County, Montana, el. 
 S'il Vous Plait Falls, Gallatin County, Montana, el. 
 Silken Skein Falls, Gallatin County, Montana, el. 
 Skalkaho Falls, Ravalli County, Montana, el. 
 Snowshoe Falls, Missoula County, Montana, el. 
 Specimen Falls, Park County, Montana, el. 
 Star Falls, Ravalli County, Montana, el. 
 Sutton Creek Falls, Lincoln County, Montana, el. 
 Swiftcurrent Falls, Glacier County, Montana, el. 
 Taylor Falls, Madison County, Montana, el. 
 Tenmile Falls, Lincoln County, Montana, el. 
 Terrace Falls, Lake County, Montana, el. 
 Thunderbird Falls, Glacier County, Montana, el. 
 Turner Falls, Lincoln County, Montana, el. 
 Twin Falls, Glacier County, Montana, el. 
 Twin Falls, Gallatin County, Montana, el. 
 Two Medicine Falls, Glacier County, Montana, el. 
 Upper Big Timber Falls, Sweet Grass County, Montana, el. 
 Upper Falls, Lincoln County, Montana, el. 
 Vermilion Falls, Sanders County, Montana, el. 
 Virginia Falls, Glacier County, Montana, el. 
 Whale Creek Falls, Flathead County, Montana, el. 
 White Quiver Falls, Glacier County, Montana, el. 
 Wolf Creek Falls, Fergus County, Montana, el. 
 Woodbine Falls, Stillwater County, Montana, el. 
 Yaak Falls, Lincoln County, Montana, el.

See also
 Rivers of Montana

Notes

 
Montana